The 1960 Commonwealth Prime Ministers' Conference was the tenth Meeting of the Heads of Government of the Commonwealth of Nations. It was held in the United Kingdom in May 1960, and was hosted by that country's Prime Minister, Harold Macmillan.

This was the first Commonwealth conference since Malayan independence in August 1957 and saw the growing importance of the non-white  "New Commonwealth" countries. Malaya's prime minister, Tunku Abdul Rahman and his government vigorously opposed the apartheid policies of South Africa and, with the support of Pakistan, India and Ghana, demanded that the issue be addressed by the Commonwealth. However, Macmillan insisted that the final communique could only include matters on which the leaders were unanimous. Ghana advised the meeting that it would be becoming a republic and South Africa advised that it would be holding a referendum on the issue. Ghana was advised that its continued membership in the Commonwealth as a republic was recognised, however, South Africa was advised that it would need to seek consent of other Commonwealth governments for its membership to continue.

Participants

References

1960 in London
1960 in South Africa
1960
Diplomatic conferences in the United Kingdom
20th-century diplomatic conferences
1960 in international relations
Events associated with apartheid
1960 conferences
May 1960 events in the United Kingdom
1960s in the City of Westminster
South Africa and the Commonwealth of Nations
Harold Macmillan
Robert Menzies
John Diefenbaker
Kwame Nkrumah
Jawaharlal Nehru